Johan Maurits Verminnen (born 22 May 1951 in Wemmel, Belgium) is a Belgian singer.

Discography
2019 En Daarna ga ik Vissen (Album)
2016 Tussen een Glimlach en een Traan (Album)
2014 Stemmen (Album)
2009 Solozeiler (Album)
2007 Over Mensen, Boten en Steden (Album)
2005 Hartklop
2003 Tegenlicht (Album)
2001 Swingen tot Morgenvroeg
1999 Vroeger en Later
1999 Het beste van Johan Verminnen
1998 Marin d'eaux douces
1996 Suiker en zout
1994 Alles leeft
1993 Zeven levens
1991 Volle maan
1989 Mooie Dagen - 20 Jaar Liedjes (Album)
1987 Traag is mooi
1984 Melancholie
1983 Tweemaal woordwaarde
1981 Ik voel me goed
1979 Als mijn gitaar me helpt
1977 Live
1976 Stilte als refrein
1975 Verminnen Verzameld
1974 Elle chante na na na
1973 Ze zingt nanana
1970 Johan Verminnen

External links
 Official site of Johan Verminnen
 Johan Verminnen - The Belgian Pop & Rock Archives

1951 births
Living people
People from Flemish Brabant
Belgian male singers
Dutch-language singers of Belgium